Wincheap is a road and suburb in Canterbury, Kent, England.

History
There are two theories about the name: either it comes from the Saxon Wenchiape, a wine market, or from Weychep from the old English Waegnceap, indicating a wagon market.

Wincheap originated as an ancient trackway to the east of the River Stour. In Roman Britain it was used for communication between Canterbury and the iron works in the Weald. The modern street was established by the early 13th century; the name is recorded starting in 1226. Wincheap Gate, since demolished, was one of the entrances in the city walls. A timber market was held halfway along Wincheap in the 13th century, while an annual cherry fair took place on Wincheap Green until the early 19th century. The green was destroyed during construction of the Canterbury Ring Road in the 1960s.

Since 1996, most of Wincheap from the railway bridge to the A2 bypass has been marked as a conservation area by the city council. There is a petrol station halfway along the road, which has been criticised for having a negative effect on the area. At the end of 2021, the council announced plans to make Wincheap one-way southbound, sending northbound traffic via a different route.

Properties

Nos. 50–52 were constructed in the 18th century and were originally a single house. They are three storeys high and constructed of red brick. They were Grade II listed in 1973.

Wincheap House at No. 74 was constructed in the 16th century. Originally a timber-framed building, it was extensively rebuilt in the 18th century, though the overhang of the top two floors was retained, as was the 16-panelled front door. The premises was Grade II listed in 1949.

Nos. 96–116 date from the early 18th century, and are a group of two-storey brick houses that are a mixture of painted, stuccoed and roughcast, included hipped tiled roofs. They were Grade II listed in 1973. 

Nos. 160–164 are a terrace of early 19th century red brick houses. No. 160 has a more decorative door than the others. The terrace was Grade II listed in 1973.

The Thanington Hotel is at No. 140. It dates from the early 19th century and is a three-storey building rendered with cement. It was Grade II listed in 1967 along with Nos. 126–136.

The King's Head Inn at Nos. 198–204 Wincheap was established around the early 15th century and is believed to be the city's oldest continuously trading inn. The timber-framed exterior was re-fronted in the 18th century, preserving the overhang of the first floor. The building includes a tile-hung rear elevation. It was Grade II listed in 1967.

The Wincheap Non-Conformist Burial Ground sits alongside the King's Head on the west side of Wincheap. It was established in 1849 and contains 281 graves; the last burial occurred in 1962. It was restored in 1997 and financed by the National Lottery Heritage Fund.

Nos. 268–274 form a terrace of red brick houses. They were constructed in 1771.

The Hospital of St James by Canterbury was based at the southern edge of Wincheap where the road meets Thanington. It was established in the 12th century for female lepers, and maintained by three priests. It survived the dissolution of similar hospitals during the reign of Henry VIII, and closed on 28 February 1551 under the reign of Edward VI. All premises and all possessions were surrendered to the crown.

The Thanington Pumping Station was based at the edge of the conservation area at the southeast part of Wincheap. It opened in 1869 and was designed by Samuel Collett Homersham. It was demolished in the 1990s and replaced with a small retail park.

A telephone box at the north end of Wincheap by the railway bridge was Grade II listed in 1989. It was built in 1935 by Sir Giles Gilbert Scott and constructed from cast iron.

References
Citations

Sources

 

Canterbury
Conservation areas in England